The Ivanja Reka interchange is a cloverleaf interchange east of Zagreb, Croatia. The interchange represents the southern terminus of the A4 motorway and it connects the A4 route to the A3 motorway representing major a link in the Croatian motorway system. The interchange is a part of Pan-European corridors Vb and X. It also represents a junction of European routes E65, E70 and E71.

The interchange was completed at junction of the Slavonska Avenue—four lane road providing access to Zagreb, present-day A3 motorway section to Lipovljani, built in 1980, and a  section between the Lučko and Ivanja Reka interchanges, a section of the Zagreb bypass opened in 1981. It was named after the nearby village of Ivanja Reka. The interchange originally also included a four-lane road, later upgraded and renamed as A4 motorway connecting Varaždin.

See also 

 International E-road network
 Transport in Croatia

References

Buildings and structures in Zagreb County
Road interchanges in Croatia
Roads in Zagreb